The 1310s BC is a decade which lasted from 1319 BC to 1310 BC.

Events
 The Bhagavad Gita is written, according to Hindu traditions.
 1319 BC (or 1306 BC)—Horemheb assumes the throne of Ancient Egypt.
 1317 BC—Enlil-nirari succeeds his father as king of Assyria.
 June 24 1312 BC (or April 13 1308 BC) – Mursili II launches a campaign against the Kingdom of Azzi-Hayasa.

Significant people
Ramesses I, pharaoh of Egypt, is born (approximate date).
Seti I, pharaoh of Egypt, is born (approximate date).

References